This is a list of women artists who were born in Mexico or whose artworks are closely associated with that country.

A
Amelia Abascal (born 1923), painter, sculptor
Graciela Abascal (1939–2020), painter
Eunice Adorno (born 1982), photographer 
Tanya Aguiñiga (born 1978), designer, contemporary artist
Ana Karen Allende (active since 2002), doll designer
Lourdes Almeida (born 1952), photographer
Lola Álvarez Bravo (1903–1933),  photographer
Pola Weiss Álvarez (1947–1990), video artist  
Blanka Amezkua (born 1971), contemporary artist
Laura Anderson Barbata (born 1958), contemporary artist
Yolanda Andrade (born 1950), photographer
Angélica Argüelles Kubli (born 1963), graphic designer
Mónica Arreola (born 1976), visual artist
Patricia Aridjis (born 1960), visual artist, photographer
Marcela Armas (born 1976), performance artist, interdisciplinary artist

B
Mely Barragán (born 1975), contemporary artist 
Sofía Bassi (1913–1998), surrealist painter, writer
Jeannette Betancourt (born 1959), sculptor, multidisciplinary artist
Cannon Bernáldez (born 1974), visual artist, photographer 
Katnira Bello (born 1976), conceptual artist, performance artist, photographer
Rocío Boliver (born 1956), performance artist
Maris Bustamante (born 1949), interdisciplinary artist
Helen Bickham (born 1935), Eurasian painter now in Mexico
Marisa Boullosa (born 1961), painter, printmaker
Rosa Borrás (born 1963), painter, performance artist, graphic designer
Fernanda Brunet (born 1964), painter

C
Rocio Caballero (born 1964), figurative painter
Valeria Caballero (born 1986), visual artist, curator, photographer
Geles Cabrera (born 1929), sculptor
Rosario Cabrera (1901–1975), painter
Yolanda Cabrera (active since 1999), painter
Adriana Calatayud (born 1967), visual artist, photographer
Celia Calderón (1921–1969), engraver, painter
Valerie Campos (born 1983), graphic artist
Tania Candiani (born 1974), contemporary artist
Estrella Carmona (1962–2011), painter
Angélica Carrasco (born 1967), graphic artist
Lilia Carrillo (1930–1974), painter
Leonora Carrington (1917–2011), English-born Mexican painter
Ana Casas Broda (born 1965), photographer 
Rosalinda Cauich Ramirez (born 1962), basket weaver
Cerrucha (born 1984), artivist, photographer 
Nelly César (born 1986), experimental and multidisciplinary visual artist
Mayra Céspedes (born 1981), visual artist, photographer 
Maria Eugenia Chellet (born 1948) photographer, mixed media, performance artist
Livia Corona Benjamin (born 1975), multi-media artist
Olga Costa (born 1993), German-born painter
Margarita Cruz Sipuachi (active since 2000), potter
Verónica Cuervo (born 1958), photographer, cinematographer 
Lola Cueto (1897–1978), painter, puppet designer

D
Marianna Dellekamp (born 1968), photographer, conceptual artist
Yvonne Domenge (born 1946), painter, sculptor
Olga Dondé (1937–2004), painter
Mónica Dower (born 1966), British-born Mexican painter, photographer, performance artist 
Kimberly "Shmi" Duran (born 1989), muralist

E
Daniela Edburg (born 1975), photographer, installation artist.
Natalia Eguiluz (born 1978), feminist artist
Laura Elenes (1933–2005), painter, sculptor, printmaker
Helen Escobedo (1934–2010), sculptor, installation artist
Angélica Escoto (born 1967), photographer, performance artist
Carol Espíndola (born 1982), photographer 
María Ezcurra (born 1973), feminist artist

F
Sonia Félix Cherit (born 1961), activist, feminist visual artist
Ana Teresa Fernández (born 1980), performance artist, painter
Andrea Ferreyra (born 1970), Uruguayan-born Mexican visual artist, art critic, curator
Sairi Forsman (born 1964), sculptor

G
Liliana Gálvez (born 1981), painter
Claudia Gallegos (born 1967), visual artist
Maru de la Garza (born 1961), visual artist, photographer 
Carmen Gayón(born 1951), printmaker
Manuela Generali (born 1948), Swiss painter active in Mexico
Mercedes Gertz (born 1965), painter
Maya Goded (born 1967), photographer, filmmaker
Andrea Gómez (1926–2012), graphic artist, muralist
Consuelo González Salazar (born 1941), painter
Lucero González (born 1947), feminist artist, photographer, videographer
Ilse Gradwohl (born 1943), Austrian-born Mexican painter
Patricia Greene (born 1952), textile artist
Lourdes Grobet (born 1940), photographer
Silvia Gruner (born 1959), sculptor, video artist
Joyce de Guatemala (1938–2000), sculptor
Ángela Gurría (born 1929), sculptor, first female member of the Academia de Artes
Eloísa Jiménez Gutiérrez (1908–1990), painter
Azteca de Gyves (born 1963), painter

H

 Martha Hellion, visual artist
 Marianela De La Hoz (born 1956), painter

I
Graciela Iturbide (born 1942), photographer 
María Izquierdo (1902–1955), painter

J
Rosa Lie Johansson (died 2004), Swedish-Mexican painter

K
Frida Kahlo (1907–1954), painter
Berta Kolteniuk (born 1958), contemporary artist, curator
Perla Krauze (born 1953), painter
Anna Kurtycz (1970–2019), graphic artist

L
Magali Lara (born 1956), contemporary artist 
Myra Landau (1926–2018), Romanian born Mexican painter
María José Lavín (born 1957), sculptor 
Rina Lazo (1923–2019), Guatemalan muralist active in Mexico
Paula Lazos (1940–2010), painter
Gabriela León (born 1973), activist, visual artist, poet
Alma López (active since 1999), radical Chicana artist

M
María José de la Macorra (born 1964), contemporary artist
Elsa Madrigal (born 1971), printmaker
Tosia Malamud (1923–2008), sculptor
Rocio Maldonado (born 1951), contemporary artist
Luna Marán (born 1986), filmmaker
Teresa Margolles (born 1963), conceptual artist, photographer, videographer, performance artist
Carmen Mariscal (born 1968), photographer, sculptor, videographer
Lucía Maya (born 1953), painter, sculptor, lithographer
Mónica Mayer (born 1954), conceptual artist,  performance artist, photographer
Edith Medina (born 1979), visual artist, curator
Miriam Medrez (born 1958), sculptor 
Patricia Mejía Contreras (1958–2007), sculptor, graphic artist
Carol Miller (born 1933), sculptor, author
Sarah Minter (born 1953), filmmaker
Carmen Mondragón (1893–1978), model, painter, poet
Natasha Moraga, contemporary mural artist
Maritza Morillas (born 1969), contemporary painter
Amor Muñoz (born 1979), visual artist

N
María de Jesús Nolasco Elías (1944–2000), potter
Dulce María Nuñez (born 1950), painter

O
Gabriela Olivo de Alba (born 1953), performance artist 
Guillermina Ortega (born 1960), visual artist 
Iliana Ortega (born 1981), visual artist
Emilia Ortiz (1917–2012), painter, cartoonist, caricaturist, poet

P
Irma Palacios (born 1943), abstract painter 
Marta Palau Bosch (born 1934), sculptor, painter, textile art
Sandra Pani (born 1964), painter
Tatiana Parcero (born 1967), photographer 
Ámbar Past  (born 1949), poet, visual artist
Alicia Paz (active since 1998), painter
Nirvana Paz (born 1976), visual artist, poet
Dulce Pinzon (born 1974), contemporary artist
Ambra Polidori (born 1954), photographer, filmmaker
Maribel Portela (born 1960), sculptor, potter
Ale de la Puente (born 1968), conceptual artist, writer, curator

Q

 Georgina Quintana (born 1956), visual artist
 Grace Quintanilla (1967–2019),  transdisciplinarity artist
 Lorena Quiyono (born 1967), painter, installation artist, performance artist

R
Fanny Rabel (1922–2008), Polish-born Mexican muralist
Adriana Raggi Lucio (born 1970), painter, photographer, videographer
Regina Raull (1931–2019), Spanish-born Mexican painter
Alice Rahon (1904–1987), poet, painter
María Luisa Reid (born 1943), painter, sculptor
Aurora Reyes Flores (1908–1985), painter, first Mexican female muralist
Myriam de la Riva (born 1940), painter
Mirna Roldán (born 1988), feminist visual artist
Betsabeé Romero (born 1963), sculptor, printmaker, photographer  
Ingrid Rosas (born 1967), abstract artist
Elizabeth Ross (born 1954), visual artist, writer, curator
Verónica Ruiz de Velasco (born 1968), painter

S
Herlinda Sánchez Laurel (born 1941), painter, educator
Alma Karla Sandoval (born 1975), poet
Maruch Santíz Gómez (born 1975), photographer, writer, textile designer
Marcia Santos (born 1990), multidisciplinary visual artist
Nunik Sauret (born 1951), printmaker
Naomi Siegmann (1933–2018), sculptor

T
Bridget Bate Tichenor (1917–1990), surrealist painter
Katia Tirado (born 1965), performance artist
Ángeles Torrejón (born 1963), photographer 
Felipa Tzeek Naal (active from c.2001), palm frond weaver

U
Cordelia Urueta (1908–1995), painter
Lucinda Urrusti (born 1929), painter

V
Minerva Valenzuela (born 1976), scenic artist
Remedios Varo (1908–1963), para-surrealist painter
Angélica Delfina Vásquez Cruz (born 1958), potter 
Yvonne Venegas (born 1970), photographer 
Isabel Villaseñor (1909–1953), sculptor, printmaker, painter, poet, songwriter

W
Pola Weiss Álvarez (1947–1990) dancer, video artist
Lorena Wolffer (born 1971), activist artist
Marysole Wörner Baz (1936–2014), painter, sculptor

Y
Mariana Yampolsky (1925–2002), photographer 
Charlotte Yazbek (1919–1989), sculptor
Niña Yhared (1814) (born 1977), visual artist, performance artist
Vida Yovanovich (born 1949), Cuban-born Mexican photographer

Z
Irene Zundel (born 1958), contemporary artist

-
Mexican women artists, List of
Artists
Artists